The Rugby League Conference North West Premier is a division in the Rugby League Conference for teams in the North West of England.

It was first contested in 2008 following the break-up of the previous North Premier into the North West and Yorkshire Premiers.

History

The Rugby League Conference was born in 1997 as the Southern Conference, a 10-team pilot league for teams in the South of England and English Midlands. The first North West team to join the new league were the Chester Wolves; more teams from the North West joined the following season and a Northern Division was set up with teams from the North West and the North Midlands. Following a big expansion to the Rugby League Conference in 2003, the North West got its own regional division.

The Premier Division were set up in 2005 for teams who had achieved a certain playing standard and were able to travel further afield to find stronger opposition. The new Premier Divisions included the North Premier, the South Premier, the Central Premier and the Welsh Premier. The Central Premier had two Midlands clubs and the rest of the clubs were from Yorkshire or Lancashire whilst the North Premier had clubs from the North East of England and Cumbria. The Premier divisions saw a change in boundaries in 2006 leaving the North Premier division covering a larger area to give the Midlands clubs their own premier division.

The North West Premier came into existence in 2009 when the North Premier was replaced by the North West and Yorkshire Premiers.

Rugby League Conference Pyramid

 RLC National
 RLC North West Premier 
 RLC North West
 North West Merit League

Above the North West Premier is the National Division and below is the North West regional division followed by the North West Merit League.

Other Premier divisions are the South, Welsh, Midlands and Yorkshire.

2011 structure
Accrington & Leyland Warriors
East Lancashire Vikings
Liverpool Buccaneers
Mancunians RL
Widnes West Bank
Wigan Riversiders

League standings

Key

Titles

Predecessor competitions

2005 North Premier: West Cumbria Crusaders 
2005 Central Premier: Leeds Akkies
2006 North Premier: East Lancashire Lions
2007 North Premier: Carlisle Centurions 
2008 North Premier: Carlisle Centurions

North West Premier
2009 Lymm RL
2010 Widnes West Bank Bears

External links
 Official website
 Unofficial RLC website

Rugby League Conference
Rugby league in Cheshire
Rugby league in Lancashire
Rugby league in Greater Manchester